Anatoly Vasilyevich Makarevich (born 19 May 1970) is a Belarusian middle-distance runner. He competed in the men's 800 metres at the 1992 Summer Olympics, representing the Unified Team.

References

1970 births
Living people
Athletes (track and field) at the 1992 Summer Olympics
Belarusian male middle-distance runners
Olympic athletes of the Unified Team